Airão Santa Maria, Airão São João e Vermil (officially: União das Freguesias de Airão Santa Maria, Airão São João e Vermil) is a civil parish in the municipality of Guimarães, Portugal. It was formed in 2013 by the merger of the former parishes Santa Maria de Airão, São João Batista de Airão, and Vermil. The population in 2021 was 3,213, in an area of 7.48 km2.

References

Freguesias of Guimarães
Towns in Portugal